Birds Britannica is a book by Mark Cocker and Richard Mabey, about the birds of the United Kingdom, and a sister volume to Mabey's 1996 Flora Britannica, about British plants. It was published in 2005 by Chatto & Windus.

According to the project's official website:

It covers cultural links; social history; birds as food; ecology; the lore and language of birds; myths, art, literature and music; anecdotes, birdsong and rare facts; modern developments; migration, the seasons and our sense of place.

Over 1,000 members of the public provided details of their observations and experiences, during the book's eight-year research period. Mabey's contribution was limited by his depression, leading to Cocker having a leading role, doing the bulk of the work and this more prominent credit.

Reviews 

The Guardian described the book as "a glorious encyclopedia" and Cocker as "British bird life's perfect encyclopedist". The Times said "The entries for every species are a fascinating distillation of expert knowledge, personal account, reminiscence, literary reference and folk belief".

See also
 Birds Britannia – a 2010 television series on the same subject.

References

External links 
 

2005 non-fiction books
Ornithological literature
British books
Ornithology in the United Kingdom
Chatto & Windus books